The Benjamin Martin House near Finney, Kentucky was built in 1812 by Benjamin Martin, Sr., who lived from 1758 to 1838, and came to Kentucky from Virginia in 1784.

It is one of few Federal-style brick houses surviving from its era in Barren County, Kentucky.

The house was listed on the National Register of Historic Places in 1983.

References

Houses on the National Register of Historic Places in Kentucky
Federal architecture in Kentucky
Houses completed in 1812
National Register of Historic Places in Barren County, Kentucky
1812 establishments in Kentucky
Houses in Barren County, Kentucky